Anthia calida is a species of ground beetle in the subfamily Anthiinae. It was described by Harold in 1878.

References

Anthiinae (beetle)
Beetles described in 1878